Kim Min-kyu (born 18 October 1993) is a South Korean footballer currently playing as a forward for Changwon City.

Career statistics

Club

Notes

References

External links
 

1993 births
Living people
Dankook University alumni
South Korean footballers
Association football forwards
Korea National League players
K League 2 players
K League 1 players
K3 League players
Ulsan Hyundai FC players
Seoul E-Land FC players
Gimhae FC players
Gwangju FC players
Changwon City FC players